"Parole parole" is a duet song originally performed by Italian singer Mina and actor Alberto Lupo. It was released in April 1972, by PDU and later was included on Minas's twenty-first studio album Cinquemilaquarantatre (1972). The song was written by Gianni Ferrio, Leo Chiosso and Giancarlo Del Re.

In 1973, Dalida and Alain Delon recorded the song in French as "Paroles, paroles", that became an international hit and a standard in France.

Original version

The lyrics were written by Leo Chiosso and Giancarlo Del Re, the authors of the Italian Teatro 10 series of TV variety nights. The music and the score were by Gianni Ferrio, the conductor of the "Teatro 10" orchestra. In Spring 1972, the song was the closing number of all eight of the "Teatro 10" Saturday nights. The song is an easy listening dialogue of Mina's singing with Alberto Lupo's declamation. The song's theme are hollow words. It intertwines the female singer's lamentation of the end of love and the lies she has to hear, while the male actor simply speaks. She reacts and scoffs at the compliments that he gives her, calling them simply empty words – parole. The single was released in April 1972 under PDU, Mina's independent record label to become a top hit in Italian charts. The song was also published as one of the standout tracks of Mina's Cinquemilaquarantatrè album and included in the I'm Not Scared movie soundtrack.

Charts

Certifications

Cover versions

After Mina released the song in 1972, the same year several Spanish and Portuguese covers appeared which did not achieve success. The Italian version received three little-noticed covers, the first in 1991. In 1973, Dalida's release sparked numerous covers in various languages, mostly thanks to her international career. Since then, the song was covered dozens of times, almost all releases crediting "Paroles, paroles" by Dalida.

A parody version of "Parole parole" was performed by Adriano Celentano, Mina and Alberto Lupo on the penultimate "Teatro 10" show on 6 May 1972. In recent years the song became a part of the repertoire of Martina Feri accompanied by Gorni Kramer Quartet.
In 1973, "Paroles... paroles...", with the lyrics translated into French by Michaële, was performed by Dalida with Alain Delon and published by Polydor. The track became a hit in France, Japan, Mexico (#3 - 12 May 1973) and Canada.

On France 2's 1996 New Year's Eve programme, Alain Delon performed French cover of the song again, but this time in duet with Céline Dion, in the tribute for Dalida. In 2001, again for tributing Dalida, the French cover was remixed by the participants of the first edition of Star Academy France.

Dalida also released a German version together with Friedrich Schütter in 1973, titled "Worte, nur Worte", and again recorded the song in 1983, with Harald Juhnke, which was released under the same title.

Actress and singer Carmen Sevilla released a Spanish language version with the also actor Francisco "Paco" Rabal titled "Palabras Palabras" (literally "Parole Parole").

There is a Hungarian version from 1970s performed by Viktória Vincze and popular actor Sándor Lukács.

Vicky Leandros released a German version with the actor Ben Becker on her album Zeitlos (Timeless) in 2010 which is called "Gerede Gerede" ("Talk Talk").

"Amai Sasayaki", the song in Japanese, was recorded by actor Toshiyuki Hosokawa and the female singer Akiko Nakamura in 1973.

Two Spanish versions were recorded, one by singer Silvana di Lorenzo and another by Lupita D'Alessio and actor Jorge Vargas. D'Alessio and Vargas were married at the time and had a rocky relationship.

Portuguese versions were recorded in 1972, translated as Palavras, palavras, in Brazil sung by Maysa with actor Raul Cortez, and in Portugal, with the title "Parole Parole" sung by Tonicha with actor João Perry.

Two Dutch translations were made in 1973.  The first one in Belgium, by Nicole and Hugo : "Die woorden, die woorden" ("Those words, those words"). The second Dutch translation was made in the Netherlands by author Cees Nooteboom, entitled "Gebabbel" ("Chatter"). It was performed by Liesbeth List and Ramses Shaffy. This version was parodied in 1992 by Dutch comedian Paul de Leeuw and female singer Willeke Alberti. Their version was a major hit in The Netherlands, reaching number 2 in the Top 40.

A Turkish version was recorded by the Turkish singer and actress, Ajda Pekkan in 1973. Ajda sang the song ("Palavra palavra") with voice actor Cüneyt Türel, who added a funny touch to the song through his alterations to the spoken parts. In 2010 another version of the song was recorded by famous Turkish pop singers Göksel and Teoman.

Japanese jazz pianist Shigeo Sekito recorded an instrumental electronic version on his 1975 funk album Special Sound Series Vol. 2.

A Slovenian version was recorded by Slovenian singer Elda Viler with the Slovenian actor Boris Cavazza, titled Besede, Besede on her album Elda in 1982. Song was re-recorded in 2014 by the band Pliš (singer Aleksandra Ilijevski) with actor Jurij Zrnec.

In Croatia, the song was recorded at 1991 by singer Ksenija Erker and Croatian actor (with a certain international success) Relja Bašić. It is worth to mention that the song is recorded in Italian language with its original text. It appeared at Ksenija Erker's LP "Ciao Italia" (label: Jugoton). The song was translated to Croatian and covered again in 2006 by soul group Rivers with male vocals of Massimo Savić.

A Greek version was recorded by Greek singer Marinella with Greek actor Kostas Spyropoulos, "Kouventes" on her album I Marinella Tragouda Megales Kyries in 1992.

In 1978, a Chinese Mandarin & Cantonese dual version under the title of "別亂來" (Don't Mess Around) was recorded by Hong Kong female singer Amina (阿美娜) in duet with the Chinese lyricist Ei Tat (依達).

In 2003, the Argentine duo Pimpinela includes a Spanish versión on his album Al modo nuestro.

In 2004, a Vietnamese cover version was released: "Những Lời Mê Hoặc (Those Seductive Words)" by Minh Tuyết ft. Trần Thái Hòa.

An Italian house remix of the song was featured in the 2005 compilation album by Gigi D'Agostino, Disco Tanz.

Amanda Lear performed the French "Paroles, paroles" with Titof on TV channel M6. This version was included on her 2005 compilation Paris by Night – Greatest Hits.

In 2006, Mina collaborated with footballer Javier Zanetti in a Spanish cover of the song, found in the album Todavía. The cover went on to be certified Gold by FIMI in 2021.

Zap Mama recorded a cover version with the French actor Vincent Cassel, on her album ReCreation in 2009. The duet was recorded with Cassel in Brazil.

Another cover version was performed in German by Jens Wawrczeck and Andreas Fröhlich as a slapstick part on the live tour of Die drei Fragezeichen (German version of "The Three Investigators") in 2009.

Portuguese singer Ágata, with Vitor Espadinha, recorded a cover version in 2009 (Promessas, Promessas).

A cover version of the song was published in 2014 by the Flemish singer Licia Fox, in a duet with her producer Tormy Van Cool.

Anna Vissi and Thanasis Alevras covered the song for the main title of Annita Pania's TV show "Parole".

Azerbaijani singer with 4 range ofvoice Flora Karimova recorded the song in Azerbaijan language  "Unutma, unutma" , with Agil M.Quliyev.

Soolking used the refrain in his 2018 song "Dalida".

References

External links
 "Parole Parole" Original lyrics in Italian. Note: The recorded lyrics differ slightly from the published lyrics. Mina sings "chiamami tormento dai, hai visto mai" rather than "chiamami tormento dai, già che ci sei".
 "Parole parole" at Hit Parade
 Pimpinela official site

Songs about language
Italian songs
Male–female vocal duets
1972 songs
Dalida songs
Amanda Lear songs
Mina (Italian singer) songs
PDU singles
Number-one singles in Italy